Shinola is a defunct American brand of shoe polish.

Shinola may also refer to:

Brands
Shinola (retail company), an American luxury goods retailer

Music
Shinola (band), an American indie rock band
Shinola (Energy Orchard album), a 1993 album by Energy Orchard
Shinola (John Scofield album), a 1981 live album by John Scofield
Shinola, Vol. 1, a 2005 album by Ween
"Shinola", a 2008 song by Dolly Parton from Backwoods Barbie

See also
Shynola, a group of visual artists from the UK